The following lists events that happened during 1996 in Chile.

Incumbents
President of Chile: Eduardo Frei Ruiz-Tagle

Events

December
5 December – The Canada–Chile Free Trade Agreement is signed.

Deaths
4 January – Ramón Vinay (born 1911)
18 March – Osvaldo Rodríguez (Chilean) (born 1943)
30 August – José Toribio Merino (born 1915)
13 September – César Mendoza (born 1918)
7 December – José Donoso (born 1924)

References 

 
Years of the 20th century in Chile
Chile